Montag is German for Monday. It may also refer to:

People
Carol Montag, American folk singer-songwriter
Heidi Montag, one of the main cast members on MTV's The Hills, sister of Holly Montag
Holly Montag (born 1983), American television personality
Jan-Marco Montag (born 1983), German field hockey player
 Jemima Montag (born 1998), Australian female racewalker 
Jerzy Montag (born 1947), German politician of Polish birth
Montag (musician), stage name of Canadian electronic musician Antoine Bédard
Shirley Montag Almon (1935–1975), American economist
Sven Montag, German sprint canoer
Warren Montag (born 1952), American academic
Wolf-Dieter Montag (1924–2018), German physician and international sports administrator  

Fictional characters
Fräulein Montag, character in Franz Kafka's novel The Trial
Guy Montag, central character in Ray Bradbury's 1953 novel Fahrenheit 451

Other
Guy Montag Doe v. San Francisco Housing Authority, lawsuit by the National Rifle Association
Montag aus Licht, opera from Karlheiz Stockhausen's cycle Licht
Montag Hall (Georgia Tech) (Harold E. Montag Hall), residence hall at the Georgia Institute of Technology

Surnames from nicknames